James Waterson was a Scottish professional footballer who played as a wing half.

References

Scottish footballers
Association football wing halves
Arbroath F.C. players
Grimsby Town F.C. players
Hull Albany F.C. players
Hull Town F.C. players
English Football League players